("Shoo-Hey") is a Japanese left-handed pitcher for the Shinano Grandserows. He previously played for the Soka University, which has advanced to the semifinal of the All Japan University Baseball Championship Series 2005, the Grandserows, and the Hanshin Tigers.

Pitches
Takada possesses numerous pitches in his repertoire: a four-seam fastball that ranges from 82-86 mph (132–138 km/h) with some abnormal movement, a changeup in the high 70s (113–117 km/h), a curveball at about 75 (120 km/h), a slider at about 78 (125 km/h), a forkball, and a sinker.
Additionally, he is good at pick-off.

Statistics (Baseball Challenge League)

Related links
Baseball Challenge League
Shinano Grandserows
Shikoku-Kyūshū Island League

External links
 BCリーグ公式ホームページ
 BCリーグ情報サイト
 信州スポーツ写真館
 われらがベースボールチーム 信濃グランセローズを応援するブログ (私設ファンサイト)
 RED SEROWS　(信濃グランセローズ私設応援団)
 信濃グランセローズニュース
 信濃グランセローズ　オフィシャルWebサイト
 グランセローズプラザ店長日記
 二宮清純責任編集 SPORTS COMMUNICATIONAS
 BCリーグ　2008年度オープン戦日程
 BCリーグ　2008年度シーズン公式戦日程
 創価大学硬式野球部
 関西創価高校野球部

1985 births
Living people
People from Nishinomiya
Japanese baseball players
Hanshin Tigers players